Murchisonella anabathron, common name the platform pyramid-shell,  is a species of sea snail, a marine gastropod mollusk in the family Murchisonellidae, the pyrams and their allies.

Distribution
This species occurs off Eastern Australia, New South Wales and Tasmania; also off New Caledonia.

References

 May, W.L. (1923). An Illustrated Index of Tasmanian Shells. Hobart : Government Printer. 100 pp
 Iredale, T. & McMichael, D.F. (1962). A reference list of the marine Mollusca of New South Wales. Memoirs of the Australian Museum. 11 : 1-109
 Peñas A. & Rolán E. (2013) Revision of the genera Murchisonella and Pseudoaclisina (Gastropoda, Heterobranchia, Murchisonellidae). Vita Malacologica 11: 15-64.

External links
 To World Register of Marine Species

Murchisonellidae
Gastropods described in 1906